Ali Mahamane Lamine Zeine is a Nigerien politician and economist. He was Niger's Minister of the Economy and Finance from November 2002 to February 2010.

After serving as Director of the Cabinet of President Mamadou Tandja, Zeine was appointed to the government as Minister of the Economy and Finance on 24 October 2003.

After the newspaper editor Boussada Ben Ali alleged that Zeine had stolen money that was part of an oil contract between Niger and the People's Republic of China, Ben Ali was arrested on 23 January 2009 and sentenced to three months in prison for disseminating false information on 6 February 2009.

Tandja was ousted in a military coup on 18 February 2010 and his government was dissolved. As one of Tandja's key associates, Zeine was one of only three ministers who were not promptly released from house arrest in the days after the coup. According to one of the junta leaders, Colonel Djibrilla Hamidou Hima, the ministers "still under surveillance" had held "very sensitive portfolios" and therefore it was necessary "to ensure their security". The MNSD called for the release of Zeine, Tandja, and the others.

References

Ali Lamine Zeine : « Tous les revenus miniers sont réinvestis ». Marianne Meunier & Jean-Michel Meyer, Jeune Afrique. 22 May 2009.

Year of birth missing (living people)
Living people
Finance ministers of Niger
Ministers of council of Niger
Nigerien economists